Nelson is a city in Saline County, Missouri, United States. The population was 152 at the 2020 census.

History
Nelson was platted in 1887, and named after the Nelson family, the original owners of the town site. A post office called Nelson was in operation from 1887 until 2011.

Geography
Nelson is located at  (38.995330, -93.031928).

Demographics

2020 census
As of the census of 2020, there were 152 people, 74 households, and 62 families living in the city. The racial makeup of the city was 91.4% White, 2.0% African American, 0.7% Native American, 1.3% Asian, and 4.6% from two or more races. Hispanic or Latino of any race were 1.3% of the population.

There were 64 households, of which 43.8% were married couples living together, 10.9% had a female householder with no husband present, 0.0% had a male householder with no wife present, and 45.3% were non-families. 28.2% of all households were made up of individuals, and 11.5% had someone living alone who was 65 years of age or older. The average family size was 2.81.

The median age in the city was 38.6 years. 9.3% of residents were under the age of 5; 26.5% were under the age of 18; 73.5% were 18 years of age or older; and 16.7% were 65 years of age or older.

2010 census
As of the census of 2010, there were 192 people, 78 households, and 51 families living in the city. The racial makeup of the city was 91.7% White, 3.1% African American, 0.5% Native American, 0.5% Asian, and 4.2% from two or more races. Hispanic or Latino of any race were 1.0% of the population.

There were 78 households, of which 35.9% had children under the age of 18 living with them, 48.7% were married couples living together, 11.5% had a female householder with no husband present, 5.1% had a male householder with no wife present, and 34.6% were non-families. 28.2% of all households were made up of individuals, and 11.5% had someone living alone who was 65 years of age or older. The average household size was 2.46 and the average family size was 2.84.

The median age in the city was 40.8 years. 26% of residents were under the age of 18; 6.8% were between the ages of 18 and 24; 24.5% were from 25 to 44; 32.9% were from 45 to 64; and 9.9% were 65 years of age or older. The gender makeup of the city was 50.0% male and 50.0% female.

2000 census
As of the census of 2000, there were 212 people, 83 households, and 58 families living in the city. The population density was 640.5 people per square mile (248.0/km). There were 100 housing units at an average density of 302.1 per square mile (117.0/km). The racial makeup of the city was 93.40% White, 6.13% African American, and 0.47% from two or more races.

There were 83 households, out of which 28.9% had children under the age of 18 living with them, 53.0% were married couples living together, 9.6% had a female householder with no husband present, and 30.1% were non-families. 16.9% of all households were made up of individuals, and 8.4% had someone living alone who was 65 years of age or older. The average household size was 2.55 and the average family size was 2.95.

In the city the population was spread out, with 24.1% under the age of 18, 5.7% from 18 to 24, 33.0% from 25 to 44, 25.0% from 45 to 64, and 12.3% who were 65 years of age or older. The median age was 38 years. For every 100 females there were 98.1 males. For every 100 females age 18 and over, there were 96.3 males.

The median income for a household in the city was $28,214, and the median income for a family was $31,250. Males had a median income of $24,219 versus $16,500 for females. The per capita income for the city was $12,886. About 6.3% of families and 11.8% of the population were below the poverty line, including 22.2% of those under the age of eighteen and 10.5% of those 65 or over.

References

External links
 Historic maps of Nelson in the Sanborn Maps of Missouri Collection at the University of Missouri

Cities in Saline County, Missouri
Cities in Missouri